Francesco Colonna may refer to:

 Francesco Colonna (writer) (1433–1527), Italian Dominican priest and monk credited with the authorship of the Hypnerotomachia Poliphili

 Francesco Colonna (bishop) (1597–1653), Roman Catholic prelate who served as Bishop of Castro di Puglia (1642–1653)